Cycas nitida is a species of cycad endemic to the northern Philippines. It is found in littoral forests.

Range
Cycas nitida has been recorded in the following locations.

Babuyan Islands: Dalupiri
Luzon: Quezon, Polillo, Alabat, Rapu-Rapu

References

nitida